Immaculate Heart may refer to:

Immaculate Heart of Mary, a religious doctrine related to Sacred Heart of Jesus
Sisters, Servants of the Immaculate Heart of Mary, a religious order
Sisters of the Immaculate Heart of Mary, a religious order, and its descendant institutions.
Congregations of the Heart of Mary, the name of several religious congregations